R. flavescens may refer to:

 Ramaria flavescens, a clavarioid fungus
 Ramariopsis flavescens, a coral fungus
 Rhysotoechia flavescens, a tropical rainforest tree